Maylin "Maey" Bautista (born May 5, 1973), also known as Maey B, is a Filipino journalist, host, actress, and comedian. She is known for her tandem with Betong Sumaya since they participated in Survivor Philippines: Celebrity Doubles Showdown.

Bautista is also known for hosting several GMA Public Affairs programs including Day Off, May Tamang Balita, AHA!, and Good News.

Filmography

Television 

 plus more shows / guestings in GMA News TV
 the selected list above is incomplete

Films

See also 
 Betong Sumaya
 Boobay
 Pekto

References

External links 
 
 https://www.gmanetwork.com/sparkle/artists/maeybautista

1972 births
Living people
Filipino television journalists
Filipino television actresses
Filipino women comedians
Participants in Philippine reality television series
Survivor Philippines contestants
GMA Network personalities
GMA Integrated News and Public Affairs people
Women television journalists